I Not Stupid Too is a 2006 Singaporean satirical comedy film and the sequel to the 2002 film, I Not Stupid. A satirical comedy, I Not Stupid Too portrays the lives, struggles and adventures of three Singaporean youths—8-year-old Jerry, his 15-year-old brother Tom and their 15-year-old friend Chengcai—who have a strained relationship with their parents. The film explores the issue of poor parent-child communication.

The director and screenwriter, Jack Neo, was inspired to make the film by a book about appreciation education. The movie was produced by MediaCorp Raintree Pictures on a budget of S$1.5 million. It stars Ashley Leong, Shawn Lee, Joshua Ang, Xiang Yun, Jack Neo and Huang Yiliang. Filming took place at several Singaporean schools in June 2005.

I Not Stupid Too was released in cinemas on 26 January 2006, and earned over S$4 million in total. The film became the second-highest grossing Singaporean film in history, with only Money No Enough grossing more. At the 2006 Hong Kong Film Awards, it was nominated for Best Asian Film, but lost to Riding Alone for Thousands of Miles. Critical reception was ranged from a positive review, although some criticized the film as overly preachy. A serialised version of the film was aired on Channel 8, and a Malay language remake was done four years later.

Plot
The Yeo parents, Karen, a magazine editor and Steven, a 3G phone sales representative, neglect their two children, Tom and Jerry. Tom was a Normal Technical student from Singapore High who studies along with his friend Lim Chengcai, who lives with a widowed father and possesses a fighting talent, and a teacher, Fu, who criticizes them on their work by not looking at the merits which another teacher he advises on; Jerry was a Primary school student, an avid performing arts performer who always studies hard, getting all Band 1 in every subjects because he is a fourth grader, but was chastised for the lack of improvement.

Jerry is chosen as a lead for a school concert and during rehearsals, the students tease him by bumping his classmate Xiaoxi with lips touching each other. A worrying Xiaoxi wishes not to be pregnant and wants to perform abortion, which Jerry uses his savings to buy pineapples after referring to a superstition, resulting in her being brought to a clinic and Jerry getting scolded by his parents. Steven's mother comes to Jerry's defence, but Steven replied that they were unaware of Jerry's actions. This results in a quarrel between Steven and Karen, which results in them isolating themselves; this tension was relieved a few days later where Jerry stealthily messages each other an apology.

The following day, Tom is attacked by a gang and Chengcai attacks them back, but accidentally runs across Fu and runs away, leading to the school principal's attention. Afterwards, Chengcai's father visits his coffee shop owner and close friend Yang before he goes on to buy a school bag to give to Chengcai, replacing an old bag which was damaged due to an argument. He purchases a bag with a cartoon design under a tight budget, but Chengcai declines it; he convinces Chengcai on changing his school bag by explaining the merits but fails, leading him to frisk his bag. After seeing a failed exam paper, Chengcai run offs, while the father kept the new bag inside a store room.

One day, while the school is conducting phone checks, Tom accidentally drops a pornographic VCD while confiscating his handphone. Tom kicks the disk to other students until it was landed onto Fu, who confiscates it. Chengcai then gets into a physical fight him while the students who had not surrendered the handphones take videos of the scuffle. The principal decides to expel Chengcai due to multiple disciplinary records and subject Tom to public caning for his part in the scuffle. This later becomes controversial as debates on caning across Singapore become headlines and the recorded video went viral. Both Karen and Fu resign, but the latter is declined by the school since the principal tells that he is not to blame for the incident and adds on his efforts as being a dedicated remedial teacher. Meanwhile, Tom and Chengcai join a gang.

Tom runs off at home after Karen spotted him blogging and calls Steven to find him and his the gang, but he refuses as he was deemed useless on his perspective and actions never deem worthy by the parents, leading to a brawl and are arrested. Steven later gives Tom a 3G handphone in hopes on his communication.

A desperate Jerry, after unable to ask his parents to see his concert, begins saving up $500 after overhearing a phone conversation with Steven to see his presentation for an hour. Despite selling his Pokémon trading cards and unable to retrieve his deposit from a bank account, Jerry steals the money from a stall and able to reach $500, but shortly he gives the money to Tom, who reveals that he needs more money to pay a $2,000 ransom from the 'fake' policemen for their theft. The parents shortly learn on his theft, and assume that he stole the money to buy Pokémon cards. After he is caught, a furious Mr. Yeo canes the boy, but stops when Jerry explains that he actually intended to buy an hour of their time to see the concert using his savings, but could not raise enough, even after selling all his Pokémon cards. Shortly later this time, their parents went to visit Tom's room, and begin to broke down after seeing his paper notes and blog posts that he disappointed them.

Meanwhile, out on the blue on the same day right after the caning occurred, Tom and Chengcai desperately go to steal a necklace from an elderly but after running away and reflecting upon their misdeeds, they go to return it but the other residents go down to apprehend them. Tom's phone drops while he is running away, activating a speed dial on Steven who rushes off while conducting a vital presentation on 3G phones with the Chinese shareholders, despite his boss's will against him leaving the site. Lim, after visiting a clinic, goes to protect Chengcai from the fight but he ends up being knocked unconscious as well. Meanwhile, Steven arrives on the site to defend Tom's action for stealing. This is backed by Karen, Jerry and his mother, explaining that they have failed their responsibilities as parents despite the caning and lecturing. Steven concludes the speech by begging the elder to be arrested by police, but she excused them by explaining to the police about the prank call.

That evening at the same day the robbery happened, Lim was being rushed to the hospital due to him being falling down from the stairs during the scuffle. He was visited by Chengcai and Yang. Later, Yang scolded Chengcai about Lim’s caring of him (e.g. buying the school bag, finding schools across Singapore and writing 163 letters to all of them) and walks away, crying. At the Lim residence that night, Chengcai takes out his school bag from his cupboard and looked at it in tears.

Tom encountered the imposters once again, Steven gave them hell money and the police came shortly to warrant their arrest as they were the real criminals here. Shortly after the arrest of the imposters, Steven received a call from the boss to inform his promotion as a Chief Operating Officer, but he declined to comment on his return. Meanwhile, Lim visited schools to try to accept Chengcai but unsuccessful; after Lim was hospitalized in a critical state due to the fight with people who want to apprehend Chengcai for robbing the old lady, he returned to the school to ask the principal for reinstating him. Initially refused, but she accepts under the encouragement of Fu and after visiting Lim. In his last words, Lim encourages Chengcai to aim for the top to prove his worth. Following his death, Yang appointed as Chengcai's legal guardian.

In the epilogue, Fu's teaching attitude improves and the principal improves her Chinese speaking, while Chengcai becomes a martial arts trainer and eventually a world champion in an international fighting tournament. Finally, Tom and rest of the Yeo family manage to attend Jerry's concert.

Cast
 Ashley Leong as Jerry YeoThe younger brother of two of the Yeo family, and doubled as the film's narrator. He was charismatic and interested in performing arts.
 Charles Chan played as an infant Jerry, and Raffles Neo played as a baby Jerry during the film's epilogue.
 Shawn Lee as Tom YeoThe elder brother of two of the Yeo family. Lee reprises his role as Liu Kok Pin from the first film.
 Joshua Ang as Lim ChengcaiA close friend of Tom and a good martial arts street fighter. Ang reprises his role as Ang Boon Hock from the first film.
 Xiang Yun as Karen YeoThe mother of the Yeo family and is a magazine editor. Xiang reprises her role as the mother of Liu Kok Pin from the first film.
 Jack Neo as Steven YeoThe father of the Yeo family who is a salesman of handphones. Neo reprises his role as the father of Liu Kok Pin from the first film. However in this film, he is a lot stricter than Mr. Liu from the first film.
 Huang Yiliang as Mr. Lim, the father of ChengcaiIt was revealed in the film that he had previously lived in an environment of thugs and an ex-convict, though was overprotective on Chengcai's actions. This is also his only film role to date under his Mediacorp management.
 Ng Suan Loi as Jerry and Tom's grandmother and the mother of Steven and mother-in-law for KarenShe served as an advisor to Steven and Karen, and also shares experience as a parent to Steven.
 Selena Tan as the school principalA school principal with inarticulate Mandarin Chinese, as seen in the film she was attempting to speak fluent Chinese while mixing some with English. Tan previously portrayed the role as the mother of Terry Khoo from the first film, in which Tan spoke a majority of English dialogue during that film.
 Johnny Ng as Mr. FuA school teacher specializes in Chinese language. He was praised by the school as a dedicated teacher who invested money on dictionaries and time as a remedial teacher, though sometimes strict in terms on the student's academic results. He was also the form teacher for Tom and Chengcai's class, which falls under the Normal (Technical) stream.
 Nick Shen as Mr. HeA school teacher who teaches another class from the Express stream.
 Natalli Ong Ai Wen as Wang JingjingTom and Chengcai's classmate under Mr. Fu's class.
 Tan Xinyi as XiaoxiJerry's classmate and closest friend.
 Liu Lingling as Yang She was the coffee shop owner and a close friend of Lim. Following Lim's death at the end of the film, she was later a legal guardian for Chengcai.

Additional appearances in the film include Henry Thia as a sales owner in a bag store, and Jimmy Nah as an imposter police officer. The J-Team Production Academy also played a role as other students in the respective classes. Malaysian actress Asmiyati Asbah played as the maid for the Yeo family. Getai singer and another actress Anna Lim made a cameo appearance as a school principal in another school, while Yoo Ah Min portrays as an elderly who is a victim of a stolen necklace.

Production
After the release of I Not Stupid, a sequel was suggested, but Neo had difficulty finding a suitable topic. His inspiration was a book on appreciation education, a method of teaching developed by Chinese educator Zhou Hong. Through the film, Neo hoped to capture the culture of Singapore at the turn of the millennium, and to explore the issue of poor parent-child communication.

Neo and Rebecca Leow co-wrote the script, which was completed in May 2005. I Not Stupid Too was produced by MediaCorp Raintree Pictures on a budget of S$1.5 million. Shanghai Film Studio had agreed to co-produce I Not Stupid Too with Raintree Pictures, but backed out because they found the film too liberal. The production crew included Daniel Yun as executive producer, Chan Pui Yin and Seah Saw Yan as producers, Ardy Lam as cinematographer and Mo Ju Li as sound editor. Besides writing and directing, Neo starred as Mr. Yeo and composed the theme song, which was sung by Hong Junyang.

Filming took place at Saint Hilda's Primary School, Presbyterian High School and other locations during the school holidays in June 2005. Neo hired real gangsters to act in several gangster scenes as he was dissatisfied with the extras. According to him, communicating with the gangsters was difficult, but when he decided to apply the lessons from the film and praised them for a good take, they reacted well. Several members of the cast also said that I Not Stupid Too inspired them to communicate better with their family members. On 26 January 2006, distributor United International Pictures released I Not Stupid Too on 36 screens in Singapore.

Reception
With earnings of over S$1.41 million in the first six days, I Not Stupid Too set a record for the biggest opening for a Singaporean film. The film rose to the top of the local box office, beating Jet Li's Fearless. In total, I Not Stupid Too grossed over S$4 million, becoming Singapore's second-highest grossing film after Money No Enough. The film was then released in Malaysia, where it made RM1.1 million, and Hong Kong, taking in HK$3.1 million. Following the success of the two I Not Stupid films, Neo has announced plans to make more sequels, as well as a remake set in China.

I Not Stupid Too was well received when it was showcased at the Cannes Film Festival. It was also one of six Singaporean films screened at the Singapore Season film festival in China. At the 2006 Moscow International Film Festival for Children and Youth, I Not Stupid Too captured the Children's Jury Award. The film was also nominated for Best Asian Film at the Hong Kong Film Awards, but lost to Riding Alone for Thousands of Miles.

Critics praised I Not Stupid Too for its touching portrayal of the problems faced by Singaporean teenagers. According to a review in the South China Morning Post, the film "presents a candid portrait of Singaporean society at odds with its stereotypically squeaky clean image". Nie Peng of Shenzhen Daily felt the film "captured the emotional depth and effectively conveyed the underlying theme of generation gaps", while movieXclusive.com reviewer Jolene Tan called it "a good local movie that will have [viewers] laughing in stitches and crying at certain points". However, I Not Stupid Too was also panned for being overly preachy: a reviewer for The Hindu said that the film "feels like a public service program written by Singapore's social welfare department". Geoffrey Eu, a reviewer for The Business Times, commented that it "takes the line that the viewer needs to be clubbed into submission rather than persuaded via a more subtle line of reasoning".

Malay remake
A Malay language remake titled Aku Tak Bodoh (the translation of the title of the first film) was made as a Malaysian co-production with Grand Brilliance. The film stars Jalaluddin Hassan and Adibah Noor among others, and was released on 2 December 2010 in Malaysian cinemas.

References

External links

 Official website
 

2006 films
2006 comedy-drama films
Films directed by Jack Neo
2000s Mandarin-language films
Hokkien-language films
Singaporean comedy-drama films
2006 comedy films
2006 drama films
2000s English-language films